SILA TROKH ( Translated: Power Of Three) is the third and final studio album of Russian girlband Serebro. It was released 27 May 2016 by Moonlit Records in Russia.

Background
Information that the Serebro team will release a third studio album, appeared in late August 2015. Future plate was planned to present the 30 October 2015 at a big solo concert of group "Izvestiya Hall then" Moscow club. Later all the material the girls had been working on, which had the working title of "925" in honor of the samples of the precious metal, was stolen and the release was delayed.

27 April 2016 in iTunes has been opened pre-order the upcoming album, called "The Power of Three." The disc includes 16 tracks, most of which had come out as singles. Songs from the album, "Malo Tebya" and "Ya Tebya Ne Otdam" have become hits and were able to reach the top 5 main chart Tophit, and the track "Mimimi" became sensational in the world music market. The album also included a joint single with Russian musician, DJ M.E.G., as well as the collab "Blood Diamond", with the Dutch EDM production team Yellow Claw, previously included on their debut album, Blood For Mercy.

The entire album was recorded material as part of a trio of Olga Seryabkina, Polina Favorskaya and Daria Shashina. The song "Chocolate" was the only song recorded with the participation of Katya Kischuk, replacing Daria Shashina after her departure from the group. The track "My Money" was recorded exclusively by Olga Seryabkina under the solo project by Molly.

Track listing 

 Note(s): The international edition of the album doesn't include «Kiss», «Mi Mi Mi», «Chocolate» and both versions of «My Money» but are available to download as singles

2016 albums
Serebro albums
Dance-pop albums by Russian artists
Europop albums